Chah Sorkh (also Romanized as Chāh Sorkh) is a village in Hana Rural District, Abadeh Tashk District, Neyriz County, Fars Province, Iran. At the 2006 census, its population was 650, in 144 families.

References 

Populated places in Abadeh Tashk County